Portugal participated in the Junior Eurovision Song Contest 2019 which took place on 24 November 2019 in Gliwice, Poland. The Portuguese broadcaster Radio and Television of Portugal (RTP) was responsible for organising their entry for the contest. Joana Almeida was internally selected on 26 September 2019 as the Portuguese representative.

Background

Rádio e Televisão de Portugal (RTP), a member of the European Broadcasting Union (EBU), was responsible for the selection process of participants. Portugal used a national selection format to select contestants, broadcasting a show entitled "Festival da Canção Junior". This was a junior version of Festival da Canção, the national music competition organized by broadcaster RTP to choose the Portuguese entry for the Eurovision Song Contest. The first representative to participate for the nation at the 2006 contest was Pedro Madeira with the song "Deixa-me sentir", which finished in second-last place out of fifteen participating entries, achieving a score of twenty-two points.

Artist and song information

Joana Almeida
Joana Almeida (born 27 April 2009) is a Portuguese child singer. She represented Portugal at the Junior Eurovision Song Contest 2019 with the song "Vem comigo (Come With Me)".

Vem comigo (Come With Me)
"Vem comigo (Come With Me)" is a song by Portuguese singer Joana Almeida. It represented Portugal at the Junior Eurovision Song Contest 2019.

At Junior Eurovision
During the opening ceremony and the running order draw which both took place on 18 November 2019, Portugal was drawn to perform sixteenth on 24 November 2019, following Armenia and preceding Italy.

Voting

In the contest, Portugal received no points from the professional juries; they received 43 points from the online vote.

Detailed voting results

References

Junior Eurovision Song Contest
Portugal
Junior